Carfax College, previously known as Carfax Tutorial Establishment  is a registered independent school in England, specializing in providing one-to-one and very-small-group tuition in all academic subjects to pupils of all ages. It is an examination center for all of the major British examination boards. Its current principal is Mr Carl Morris MChem (Oxon).

Inspections and Accreditations
It was rated as 'exceeding expectations' in every category by the Independent Schools Inspectorate following an inspection the PFE scheme in 2012. In 2014 it underwent a maiden inspection by Ofsted and was rated 'good'. Carfax College is a member of the Council for Independent Education. In 2011 it became one of the co-founders of the Oxford Consortium of Independent Tutorial Colleges.

Media Attention
In August 2014 Carfax College attracted attention of the national media in the UK by becoming the first independent school in the UK to charge lower tuition fees for British and European pupils than for overseas pupils.

References

External links
 School website: http://www.carfax-oxford.com
 British Boarding Schools Workshop summary of CTE: http://www.bbsw.org.uk/lib/workshop-downloads/school-profiles/Mar14/March_2014_Handbook_(Page_37).pdf

Private schools in Oxfordshire
Schools in Oxford
Educational institutions established in 2008
2008 establishments in England